Eutreptia is a genus of Euglenozoa belonging to the family Eutreptiidae.

The genus was first described by Maximilian Perty in 1852.

The genus has cosmopolitan distribution.

Species:
 Eutreptia globulifera Goor
 Eutreptia lanowii Steuer
 Eutreptia papillifera Péterfi
 Eutreptia pascheri Skvortsov
 Eutreptia pertyi Pringsheim
 Eutreptia pyrenoidifera Matvienko
 Eutreptia scotica Butcher
 Eutreptia thiophila Skuja
 Eutreptia viridis Perty

References

Euglenozoa